Afrasiab Khattak  is a Pashtun nationalist  politician and political analyst who is a senior leader of the National Democratic Movement (NDM). He has formerly served as the chairperson of the Human Rights Commission of Pakistan (HRCP), a member of the Senate of Pakistan (2009–2014), and the provincial president of the Awami National Party (ANP). He is an activist in the Pashtun Tahafuz Movement (PTM).

Khattak started his political activism against the dictator Ayub Khan because of his "one unit" formula in the 1968 but went to the Soviet Union to avoid the Great Purge authorised by the regime of General Zia-ul-Haq. Inspired by the Communist Party of the Soviet Union, Khattak joined the pro-Soviet Communist Party of Pakistan. He later joined the socialist National Awami Party in 1980 and later went into  asylum in Soviet-occupied Afghanistan, serving as the top adviser to the Soviet government in matters involving Afghanistan. After the Fall of Kabul, Khattak returned to Pakistan and founded the Afghanistan Pakistan People's Friendship Association in 2001. In 2006, Khattak joined the Awami National Party, becoming the President of ANP's central secretariat based in Khyber Pakhtunkhwa and as well as chairman of the special standing committee senate.

Biography 
Khattak became an active member of Communist Party of Pakistan. He was an active leftist politician during the 1970s and 1980s. Khattak spent many years in self-exile in Afghanistan during the 1980s due to his strong opposition to General Zia-ul-Haq's military rule.

Khattak joined the Human Rights Commission of Pakistan (HRCP) in 1989, and served as the vice-chairman of HRCP in North-West Frontier Province, for three years – he is also one of the founders of the Afghanistan Pakistan People's Friendship Association.

After rejoining the Awami National Party, he was elected in 2006 as the ANP's provincial president, leading the party to provincial victory in Pakistan's elections of 2008. Khattak was elected as senator of the Pukhtoonkhwa Assembly in March 2009.

His membership was suspended from ANP on 12 November 2018 by the party's General Secretary, Mian Iftikhar Hussain, on the directives of the party's president, Asfandyar Wali Khan.

See also 
 Human Rights Commission of Pakistan
 Khan Abdul Wali Khan
 Awami National Party

References

External links 
 Out of Communist Afghanistan

Year of birth missing (living people)
Living people
Awami National Party politicians
Pakistani communists
Pakistani democracy activists
Pakistani expatriates in Afghanistan
Pakistani human rights activists
Pakistani lawyers
Pashtun people
People from Kohat District
University of Peshawar alumni
National Democratic Movement (Pakistan) politicians